Kamenetz may refer to:
 Kamianets-Podilskyi, a city in southwestern Ukraine
 Anya Kamenetz, American writer
 Rodger Kamenetz, American writer
 Kevin Kamenetz (1957-2018), American politician and lawyer
 Dov Kamenetz, Brazilian entrepreneur
 Solange Kamenetz Szwarcbarg, French fine art painter